The 2005 Gaz de France Stars was a tennis tournament played on indoor hard courts. It was the 2nd edition of the Gaz de France Stars, and was part of the WTA International tournaments of the 2005 WTA Tour. It took place in Hasselt, Belgium, in late October, 2005.

Singles entrants

Seeds 

 Rankings as of October 17, 2005

Other entrants 
The following players received wildcards into the singles main draw:
  Els Callens
  Kirsten Flipkens

The following players received entry from the qualifying draw:
  Kaia Kanepi
  Mandy Minella
  Olga Savchuk
  Meilen Tu

Withdrawals 
Before the tournament
  Catalina Castaño
  Mariana Díaz Oliva
  Maria Kirilenko
  Alicia Molik (vestibular neuronitis)
  María Vento-Kabchi

Champions

Singles

 Kim Clijsters def.  Francesca Schiavone, 6–2, 6–3

Doubles

 Émilie Loit /  Katarina Srebotnik def.  Michaëlla Krajicek /  Ágnes Szávay, 6–3, 6–4

References

Gaz de France Stars
Gaz
Gaz de France Stars
Sport in Hasselt